The districts of Afghanistan, known as wuleswali (wuləswāləi; , shahrestān) are secondary-level administrative units, one level below provinces. The Afghan government issued its first district map in 1973. It recognized 325 districts, counting wuleswalis (districts), alaqadaries (sub-districts), and markaz-e-wulaiyat (provincial center districts). In the ensuing years, additional districts have been added through splits, and some eliminated through merges. In June 2005, the Afghan government issued a map of 398 districts. It was widely adopted by many information management systems, though usually with the addition of Sharak-e-Hayratan for 399 districts in total. It remains the de facto standard as of late 2018, despite a string of government announcements of the creation of new districts.

The latest announced set includes 421 districts. The country's Central Statistics Office (CSO) and the Independent Directorate of Local Governance (IDLG) came up with a joint, consolidated list of Afghan districts. It has handed this list over to the Independent Election Commission (IEC), which has used it in preparing the elections. The set contains 387 "districts" and 34 "provincial center districts" for 412 districts in total.

This article does not correspond with any particular district set; it lacks a number of districts currently recognized by the Afghan government, and some others that are popularly, but not officially, recognized.

Northern Afghanistan

North East Afghanistan

Badakhshan Province

 Arghanj Khwa – formerly part of Fayzabad District
 Argo – formerly part of Fayzabad District
 Baharak
 Darayim – formerly part of Fayzabad District
 Fayzabad
 Ishkashim
 Jurm
 Khash – formerly part of Jurm District
 Khwahan
 Kishim
 Kohistan – formerly part of Baharak District
 Kuf Ab – formerly part of Khwahan District
 Kuran Wa Munjan
 Maimay – formerly part of Darwaz District
 Nusay – formerly part of Darwaz District
 Ragh
 Shahri Buzurg
 Shekay – formerly part of Darwaz District
 Shighnan
 Shuhada – formerly part of Baharak District
 Tagab - formerly part of Fayzabad District
 Tishkan – formerly part of Kishim District
 Wakhan
 Wurduj – formerly part of Baharak District
 Yaftali Sufla - formerly part of Fayzabad District
 Yamgan – formerly part of Baharak District
 Yawan – formerly part of Ragh District
 Zebak

Baghlan Province

 Andarab
 Baghlan – now part of Baghlani Jadid District
 Baghlani Jadid
 Burka
 Dahana i Ghuri
 Dih Salah – formerly part of Andarab District
 Dushi
 Farang wa Gharu – formerly part of Khost Wa Fereng District
 Guzargahi Nur – formerly part of Khost Wa Fereng District
 Khinjan
 Khost wa Fereng
 Khwaja Hijran – formerly part of Andarab District
 Nahrin
 Puli Hisar – formerly part of Andarab District
 Puli Khumri
 Tala Wa Barfak

Kunduz Province

 Ali Abad
 Archi
 Chardara
 Imam Sahib
 Khan Abad
 Kunduz
 Qalay-I-Zal
 Aaqtash
 Gul Tepa
 Kalbaad

Takhar Province

 Baharak – formerly part of Taluqan District
 Bangi
 Chah Ab
 Chal
 Darqad
 Dashti Qala – formerly part of Khwaja Ghar District
 Farkhar
 Hazar Sumuch –formerly part of Taluqan District
 Ishkamish
 Kalafgan
 Khwaja Bahauddin – formerly part of Yangi Qala District
 Khwaja Ghar
 Namak Ab – formerly part of Taluqan District
 Rustaq
 Taluqan
 Warsaj
 Yangi Qala

North West Afghanistan

Balkh Province

 Balkh
 Chahar Bolak
 Chahar Kint
 Chimtal
 Dawlatabad
 Dihdadi
 Kaldar
 Khulmi
 Kishindih
 Marmul
 Mazar-e Sharif
 Nahri Shahi
 Sholgara
 Shortepa
 Zari – formerly part of Kishindih District

Faryab Province

 Almar
 Andkhoy
 Bilchiragh
 Dawlat Abad
 Gurziwan – formerly part of Bilchiragh District
 Khani Chahar Bagh
 Khwaja Sabz Posh
 Kohistan
 Maymana
 Pashtun Kot
 Qaramqol
 Qaysar
 Qurghan – formerly part of Andkhoy District
 Shirin Tagab

Jowzjan Province

 Aqcha
 Darzab
 Fayzabad
 Khamyab
 Khaniqa – formerly part of Aqcha District
 Khwaja Du Koh
 Mardyan
 Mingajik
 Qarqin
 Qush Tepa – formerly part of Darzab District
 Shibirghan

Samangan Province

 Aybak
 Dara-I-Sufi Balla – part of the former Dara-I-Suf District
 Dara-I-Sufi Payan – part of the former Dara-I-Suf District
 Feroz Nakhchir – formerly part of Khulmi District; shifted from Balkh Province
 Hazrati Sultan
 Khuram Wa Sarbagh
 Ruyi Du Ab

Sar-e Pol Province

 Balkhab
 Gosfandi – formerly part of Sayyad District
 Kohistanat
 Sangcharak
 Sar-e Pul
 Sayyad
 Sozma Qala

Central Afghanistan

Central Afghanistan

Bamyan Province

 Bamyan
 Kahmard - shifted from Baghlan Province
 Panjab
 Sayghan - formerly part of Kahmard District; shifted from Baghlan Province
 Shibar
 Waras
 Yakawlang

Kabul Province

 Bagrami
 Chahar Asyab
 Deh Sabz
 Farza - formerly part of Mir Bacha Kot District
 Guldara
 Istalif
 Kabul
 Kalakan
 Khaki Jabbar
 Mir Bacha Kot
 Mussahi
 Paghman
 Qarabagh
 Shakardara
 Surobi

Kapisa Province

 Alasay
 Hesa Awal Kohistan - part of the former Kohistan District
 Hesa Duwum Kohistan - part of the former Kohistan District
 Koh Band
 Mahmud Raqi
 Nijrab
 Tagab

Logar Province

 Azra - shifted from Paktia Province
 Baraki Barak
 Charkh
 Kharwar - formerly part of Charkh District
 Khoshi
 Mohammad Agha
 Puli Alam

Panjshir Province

 Anaba - part of the former Panjsher District
 Bazarak - part of the former Panjsher District
 Darah Abdullah khail - part of the former Hisa Duwum Panjsher District
 Khenj - part of the former Hisa Awal Panjsher District
 Paryan - part of the former Hisa Awal Panjsher District
 Rokha - created from parts of the former Hisa Duwum Panjsher and Panjsher Districts
 Shotul - part of the former Panjsher District
 Darah Abshar - part of the former Hisa Duwum Panjsher District

Parwan Province

 Bagram
 Chaharikar
 Ghorband
 Jabul Saraj
 Kohi Safi
 Salang
 Sayed Khel - formerly part of Jabul Saraj District
 Sheikh Ali
 Shinwari
 Surkhi Parsa

Maidan Wardak Province

 Chaki
 Day Mirdad
 Hisa-I-Awali Bihsud
 Jaghatu - shifted from Ghazni Province
 Jalrez
 Markazi Bihsud
 Maydan Shahr
 Nirkh
 Saydabad

Eastern Afghanistan

Kunar Province

 Asadabad
 Bar Kunar
 Chapa Dara
 Chawkay
 Dangam
 Dara-I-Pech
 Ghaziabad - formerly part of Nurgal District
 Khas Kunar
 Marawara
 Narang Wa Badil
 Nari
 Nurgal
 Shaigal - formerly part of Chapa Dara District
 Shultan - formerly part of Chapa Dara District

 Sirkanai
 Wata Pur - formerly part of Asadabad District
 Shultan - formerly part of Shaygl District

Laghman Province

 Alingar
 Alishing
 Baad Pakh - formerly part of Mihtarlam District
 Dawlat Shah
 Mihtarlam
 Qarghayi

Nangarhar Province

 Achin
 Bati Kot
 Behsud - formerly part of Jalalabad District
 Chaparhar
 Dara-I-Nur
 Dih Bala
 Dur Baba
 Goshta
 Hisarak
 Jalalabad
 Kama
 Khogyani
 Kot - formerly part of Rodat District
 Kuz Kunar
 Lal Pur
 Muhmand Dara
 Nazyan
 Pachir Wa Agam
 Rodat
 Sherzad
 Shinwar
 Surkh Rod
 Haska Meyna

Nuristan Province

 Bargi Matal
 Du Ab - created from parts of Nuristan and Mandol Districts
 Kamdesh
 Mandol
 Nurgaram - created from parts of Nuristan and Wama Districts
 Parun - formerly part of Wama District
 Wama
 Waygal

Western Afghanistan

Badghis Province

 Ab Kamari
 Ghormach
 Jawand
 Muqur
 Bala Murghab
 Qadis
 Qala-I-Naw

Farah Province

 Anar Dara
 Bakwa
 Bala Buluk
 Farah
 Gulistan
 Khaki Safed
 Lash wa Juwayn
 Pur Chaman
 Pusht Rod
 Qala i Kah
 Shib Koh

Ghor Province

 Chaghcharan (Firozkoh)
 Marghab District - formerly part of ferozkoh.
 Charsada
 Dawlat Yar
 Du Layna District
 Lal Wa Sarjangal
 Pasaband
 Saghar
 Shahrak
 Taywara
 Tulak

Herat Province

 Adraskan
 Chishti Sharif
 Farsi
 Ghoryan
 Gulran
 Guzara
 Hirat
 Injil
 Karukh
 Kohsan
 Kushk
 Kushki Kuhna
 Obe
 Pashtun Zarghun
 Shindand
 Zinda Jan (Pooshang)
 Turghandi
 Islam Qala

Southern Afghanistan

South East Afghanistan

Ghazni Province

 Ab Band
 Ajristan
 Andar
 Dih Yak
 Gelan
 Ghazni City
 Giro
 Jaghatū District
 Jaghuri
 Khugiani - created from parts of Waeez Shahid and Ghazni Districts
 Khwaja Umari - formerly part of Waeez Shahid District
 Malistan
 Muqur
 Nawa
 Nawur
 Qarabagh
 Rashidan - formerly part of Waeez Shahid District
 Waghaz - formerly part of Muqur District
 Zana Khan

Khost Province

 Bak
 Gurbuz
 Jaji Maydan
 Khost (Matun)
 Mandozai
 Musa Khel
 Nadir Shah Kot
 Qalandar
 Sabari
 Shamal - shifted from Paktia Province
 Spera
 Tani
 Tere Zayi

Paktia Province

 Ahmad Aba - formerly part of Said Karam District
 Ahmadkhel
 Dand Aw Patan
 Gardez
 Janikhel
 Lazha Mangal
 Said Karam
 Shwak
 Tsamkani
 Zadran
 Zazi
 Zurmat
 Rohani Baba
 Mirzaka
 Gerda Serai

Paktika Province

 Barmal
 Dila
 Gayan
 Gomal
 Janikhel - formerly part of Khairkot District
 Khairkot
 Mata Khan
 Nika
 Omna
 Sar Hawza
 Surobi
 Sharan
 Terwa - formerly part of Wazakhwa District
 Urgun
 Wazakhwa
 Wor Mamay
 Yahya Khel - formerly part of Khairkot District
 Yusufkhel - formerly part of Khairkot District
 Ziruk

South West Afghanistan

Daykundi Province

 Ishtarlay - part of the former Daykundi District; shifted from Uruzgan Province
 Kajran - shifted from Uruzgan Province
 Khadir - part of the former Daykundi District; shifted from Uruzgan Province
 Kiti - formerly part of Kajran District; shifted from Uruzgan Province
 Miramor - formerly part of Sharistan District; shifted from Uruzgan Province
 Nili - part of the former Daykundi District; shifted from Uruzgan Province
 Sangtakht - part of the former Daykundi District; shifted from Uruzgan Province
 Shahristan - shifted from Uruzgan Province

Helmand Province

 Baghran
 Dishu
 Garmsir
 Grishk
 Kajaki
 Khanashin
 Lashkargah
 Majrah - formerly part of Nad Ali District
 Musa Qala
 Nad Ali
 Nawa-I-Barakzayi
 Nawzad
 Sangin
 Washir

Kandahar Province

 Arghandab
 Dand
 Arghistan
 Daman
 Ghorak
 Kandahar
 Khakrez
 Maruf
 Maiwand
 Miyan Nasheen - formerly part of Shah Wali Kot District
 Naish - shifted from Oruzgan Province
 Panjwaye
 Reg
 Shah Wali Kot
 Shorabak
 Spin Boldak
 Zhari - created from parts of Maiwand and Panjwaye Districts

Nimruz Province

 Chahar Burjak
 Chakhansur
 Kang
 Khash Rod
 Zaranj

Orūzgān Province

 Chora
 Deh Rawood
 Gizab
 Khas Uruzgan
 Shahidi Hassas
 Tarinkot

Zabul Province

 Argahandab
 Atghar
 Daychopan
 Kakar - formerly part of Argahandab District
 Mezana
 Naw Bahar - created from parts of Shamulzuyi and Shinkay Districts in Zabul Province .
 Qalat (technically only a municipality, not a district)
 Shah Joy
 Shamulzayi
 Shinkay
 Tarnak Wa Jaldak
 Suria

See also

List of splits and creations of districts in Afghanistan
Valleys of Afghanistan

References

External links
Afghanistan Information Management Service , accessed 2006-07-27. [The link is broken. AIMS is defunct.]
AIMS District Matching , accessed 2009-01-01. [The link is broken. AIMS is defunct.]
Afghanistan District Maps, their history and application to population and control mapping. Accessed 2019-02-14.
District sets,  a spreadsheet of some of their most recent generations. Accessed 2019-02-24.

 
Subdivisions of Afghanistan
Districts, Afghanistan
Subdivisions of the Islamic Republic of Afghanistan